Bombycites oeningensis is an extinct lepidopteran from the Messinian (7-5 million years ago) of Öhningen, Switzerland. It is described in 1849 from a fossil pupa by the Swiss geologist and naturalist Oswald Heer. Because neither the adult nor larval forms are known, either of which contain crucial diagnostic features, its familial and superfamilial placement is uncertain.

See also
Prehistoric Lepidoptera
Prehistoric insects

References

Further reading

†
†
Fossil Lepidoptera
Miocene insects
Prehistoric insects of Europe
Fossil taxa described in 1849